Al Hazm Mall is a shopping mall on the Al Markhiya in Doha, Qatar. It is a luxury mall built at a cost of $820 million, that was opened in 2017. It is built in Italianate style with shops, cafes and restaurants ringing a central promenade. The central courtyard in Al Hazm contains green spaces with views of the complex, and olive trees between 250 and 600 years old, imported from Italy and Spain. The Al Hazm Mall was designed with 41,000 tons of stones and marbles, brought from Tuscany. Some of the brands that Al Hazm is hosting are, Bugatti, McLaren, L’ETO, Le Train Bleu, Amici di Moda, Aldo Coppola, De Beers Jewelry, Ghosn Aloud, Forever Rose, Style De Vie, Djula, Lobster or Horati.

Gallery

References

External links
 Al Hazm Mall website

Shopping malls established in 2017
Shopping malls in Doha